Glischrochilus hortensis is a species of beetle in the genus Glischrochilus of the family Nitidulidae. The genus are commonly known as 'sap-beetles'.

Description
The species is approximately 4–6 mm in length and is a uniform dark colouration on its head, thorax and abdomen. It has four prominent orange blotches on the elytra.

It is very similar in appearance to Glischrochilus quadripunctatus. In difference it is stouter, with the sides of the thorax more or less continuous with the elytra.

Distribution
Glischrochilus hortensis is a widespread Euro-Siberian species.<ref name='TJZ'>Avgin, S. S., Antonini, G., Lason, A., Jansson, N., Abacigil, T. O., Varli, S. V., De Biase, A., and Audisio, P. 2015. "New data on distribution, ecology, and taxonomy of Turkish Nitidulidae (Coleoptera)", Turkish Journal of Zoology 39. 314-322. DOI: 10.3906/zoo-1402-27</ref>

It is one of the three species of Glischrochilus found in the United Kingdom and has a wide distribution in England, Wales, and Scotland.

HabitatGlischrochilus hortensis'' is often found in woodland, particularly near exuding tree sap. It feeds on the tree sap and over-ripe fruit. A survey in Turkey in 2013 caught specimens in aerial traps baited with beer in a mixed broadleaved and coniferous tree forest.

It is active all-year round, but most often found in the months April to October.

See also
 Photographic comparison of Glischrochilus hortensis with other Glischrochilus species.
 Bibliography for Glischrochilus hortensis at Biodiversity Heritage Library

References

Beetles described in 1785
Nitidulidae
Beetles of Europe